Karaga may refer to:

 Karaga (festival), folk dance of Tamil Nadu and Karnataka
 Karaga people, geographical subgroup of the Koryaks who live in Kamchatka
 Karaga District, Northern Region, Ghana
 Karaga, Ghana, the capital city of the Karaga district
 Karaga (Ghana parliament constituency), located in the district
 Karaga, alternate name for Qareh Qayeh, Meyaneh, village in East Azerbaijan Province, Iran
 Karaga, a variety of the Mandaya language
 Bangalore Karaga, festival held in Bangalore City, Karnataka State, India
 Karaga Attam or Karakattam, ancient Tamil folk art dance
 Caraga, administrative region in the Philippines
 Karaga, a Sydney K-class ferry